Theodore Edmond Bridgewater Jr. (born November 10, 1992) is an American football quarterback who is a free agent. 

Born and raised in Miami, Florida, he graduated from Miami Northwestern high school. Bridgewater went on to play college football at Louisville, leading the Cardinals to an upset victory over the Florida Gators in the 2013 Sugar Bowl. He was selected in the first round of the 2014 NFL Draft by the Minnesota Vikings. During his second season, he led the Vikings to a NFC North division title and earned Pro Bowl honors. However, Bridgewater and the Vikings narrowly lost their 2015 Wild Card game to the Seattle Seahawks. Upon suffering a severe leg injury the following off-season, Bridgewater appeared in only one game over the next two years.

A free agent following the 2017 season, Bridgewater briefly joined the New York Jets during the 2018 season before signing with the New Orleans Saints in 2019. Serving as the Saints' backup quarterback, he eventually served as the team's starter in relief of Drew Brees. Following his time with the Saints, he was later the starting quarterback for the Carolina Panthers and Denver Broncos for one season each. Bridgewater joined the Dolphins in 2022 as a backup.

Early years
The son of Teddy Bridgewater Sr. and Rose Murphy, Bridgewater was born in Miami, Florida on November 10, 1992. He attended Miami Northwestern Senior High School. In his sophomore year, he replaced Jacory Harris as starting quarterback and took over a team that had been named the 2007 national champions by USA Today. He completed 97 of 160 attempts (60.6 percent) for 1,560 yards over the season, throwing 16 touchdowns with three interceptions. He also carried 45 times for 211 yards (4.7 average) and two more scores. Northwestern finished the season 13–3, falling short to Seminole High School of Sanford 28–21 in the 6A state title game.

As a junior, Bridgewater passed for 2,546 yards and 32 touchdowns and rushed for 379 yards and five more scores. In a late-September game against Hialeah-Miami Lakes High School, he completed 19 of 24 passes for 327 yards and a Dade County record of seven touchdowns. He was named second-team All-State for 6A classification and first-team All-County by the Miami Herald. Northwestern finished the season 10–2, after a 29–16 loss to rival Miami Central High School.

As a senior, Bridgewater had 2,606 passing yards and 22 touchdowns despite missing parts of the season with a medial collateral ligament injury. He also rushed for 223 yards and eight more scores. Northwestern had a 9–3 record for the season, losing 42–27 to Miami Central in the 6-A semifinals, in which he threw for 436 yards and scored four touchdowns.

Regarded as a four-star recruit, Bridgewater was considered the sixth best dual-threat quarterback prospect in the nation by Rivals.com. He played in the 2011 U.S. Army All-American Bowl.

Bridgewater originally committed to the University of Miami in June 2010.  But, after the firing of Miami head coach Randy Shannon in November 2010, Bridgewater switched his commitment to the University of Louisville, over additional offers from Kansas State, LSU, Florida, Rutgers, Tennessee, and USF.

College career

As a freshman at Louisville in 2011, Bridgewater entered the season as a backup to Will Stein.  However, by the Cardinals' fourth game of the season against Marshall, he was starting and remained the starter the rest of the year. He finished the season completing 191 of 296 passes for 2,129 yards with 14 touchdowns and 12 interceptions. For his play, he was named the Big East Rookie of the Year and was named a freshman All-American by Rivals.com, Scout.com, CBS Sports, and Sporting News.

As a sophomore in 2012, Bridgewater started 11 of 12 regular season games. In his only non-starting action, coming off the bench while injured against Rutgers, he led his team to a win, a Big East title, and a berth to the BCS. He finished the regular season completing 267 of 387 passes for 3,452 yards with 25 touchdowns and just 7 interceptions. He finished 6th in the nation in completion percentage, 8th in yards per attempt, and 7th in passing efficiency. For his play, he was named the Big East Offensive Player of the Year.

Bridgewater and his Cardinals football team entered the 2013 Sugar Bowl against the Florida Gators as decided underdogs. Although Florida boasted the nation's #1 pass efficiency defense, Bridgewater passed for 266 yards and a pair of touchdowns to become the game's MVP in a 33–23 win.

As a junior in 2013, Bridgewater completed 303 of 427 passes for 3,970 yards with 31 touchdowns and four interceptions. In his final college game against the Miami Hurricanes in the 2013 Russell Athletic Bowl, he completed 35 of 42 passes for 447 yards three touchdowns and was named the game's MVP.

Statistics

Professional career
As early as April 2013, Bridgewater was seen as one of the top prospects for the 2014 NFL Draft, alongside Jadeveon Clowney and Johnny Manziel. Reports said that, had he been eligible for the 2013 Draft, he most likely would have been the first quarterback taken. At one point, he was projected by many to be the first overall pick in the draft. On January 1, 2014, Bridgewater announced that he would forgo his final year of eligibility at Louisville.

Minnesota Vikings

2014 season

Bridgewater was selected by the Minnesota Vikings as the 32nd and final pick of the first round of the draft. The Vikings had traded their second round and fourth round picks to the Seattle Seahawks to move up and select Bridgewater. Bridgewater signed a four-year contract worth $6.85 million with a $3.3 million signing bonus with the Minnesota Vikings.

Bridgewater entered the season as the second-string quarterback, behind veteran Matt Cassel, but ahead of Christian Ponder. Bridgewater made his NFL debut on September 21, 2014, against the New Orleans Saints, entering in relief of the injured Cassel and finishing the game with 150 passing yards. He was named the starting quarterback for the remainder of the season after Cassel, who broke his foot in the aforementioned game, was placed on injured reserve.

On September 28, 2014, Bridgewater made his first NFL start against the Atlanta Falcons and won the game, in large part due to his 317 passing yards, and scored his first NFL touchdown on a 13-yard rush. After spraining his ankle during the Falcons matchup, Bridgewater was inactive for the next game against the Green Bay Packers in Week 5. However, he was able to recover in time for the Week 6 game against the Detroit Lions. However, a weak offensive line against a strong Lions' defense led to a 17–3 rout. Bridgewater was intercepted three times, two from tipped passes, and was sacked eight times. During Week 7 against the Buffalo Bills, Bridgewater threw his first NFL touchdown pass to Cordarrelle Patterson. Despite being sacked five times and throwing two interceptions, Bridgewater helped the Vikings get a 16–10 lead, but the effort was negated only by the Bills' comeback win which put them up 17–16 with no time to retaliate. In the next game against the Tampa Bay Buccaneers, Bridgewater threw for 241 yards and a touchdown and was sacked only once. He led a game-tying drive to force overtime, where fellow first-round pick Anthony Barr made a fumble recovery on the Bucs' first overtime play, giving the Vikings a 19–13 win. His third win as a starter, a 29–26 comeback win over the Washington Redskins, broke a franchise record shared by Fran Tarkenton and Ponder for wins among starting rookie quarterbacks. Bridgewater added to this record with wins over the Carolina Panthers, New York Jets, and Chicago Bears in weeks 13, 14, and 17 respectively. The win over the Jets is notable for when wide receiver Jarius Wright turned a screen pass from Bridgewater into an 87-yard touchdown, giving the Vikings another overtime win.

Bridgewater finished his rookie year with 2,919 passing yards, 14 touchdowns, 12 interceptions, and an 85.2 passer rating. He also rushed for 209 yards and a touchdown. He played in 13 games, starting 12 of them. On January 13, 2015, Bridgewater was selected as the quarterback of the 2014 NFL All-Rookie team by the Pro Football Writers of America, joining Tommy Kramer as the only Vikings quarterbacks to claim this award. Bridgewater also won the 2014 Pepsi Rookie of the Year award, as voted by fans.

2015 season

Bridgewater threw for no touchdowns and an interception behind a struggling offensive line that allowed five sacks in the 3–20 loss at the San Francisco 49ers in Week 1. He threw only 18 times the next game, but completed 14 of those passes for 153 yards and threw his first touchdown pass of the year to tight end Kyle Rudolph in a 26–16 win over the Detroit Lions in Minnesota's home opener. Bridgewater had some struggles in week three against the San Diego Chargers, going 13 of 24 for 121 yards and one interception but won the game 31–14 with a strong performance by the defense and running back Adrian Peterson. He rebounded to go 27 of 41, 269 yards and a touchdown pass to Mike Wallace against Denver Broncos who had the number one ranked defense coming into the game. Minnesota still lost 23–20 as Bridgewater was sacked seven times. Coming off of a bye week, he threw 31 times and completed 17 of them for 249 yards with another touchdown pass to Rudolph, but threw two interceptions in a sloppy 16–10 win against the Kansas City Chiefs. Bridgewater then had arguably the best game of his career the next week against the Detroit Lions, going 25 of 35, 316 yards, two touchdown passes and no interceptions, including his first touchdown pass to rookie Stefon Diggs. That game was Bridgewater's fourth career 300+ yard passing game, and the second 300+ passing game of Bridgewater's career against the Lions. Bridgewater led his fourth career fourth-quarter comeback at the Bears despite having a below-average day going 17 of 30, 187 yards, one touchdown and one interception. Bridgewater went 13 of 21 for 144 yards and an interception while also rushing for a touchdown and two-point conversion against the St. Louis Rams before he sustained a blow to the head by the Rams' safety Lamarcus Joyner that caused Bridgewater to leave the game in the fourth quarter. Minnesota still managed to pull off a 21–18 victory in overtime against the Rams. At home against the Chicago Bears in week 15, Bridgewater completed 17 of 20 pass attempts, four passing touchdowns, and a rushing touchdown in a 38–17 win, giving him a career-high passer rating (154.4). In a fight for the NFC North Division Title in week 17 against the Green Bay Packers, Bridgewater connected only 52.6% of his passes for 99 yards and an interception. Despite his career-lowest passer rating (45.7), the Vikings pulled off a 20–13 victory and won their first division title since 2009.

Bridgewater finished his second season with 3,231 passing yards, 14 touchdowns, and 9 interceptions. He also rushed for 192 yards and 3 touchdowns.

On January 10, in the Wild Card Round against the Seattle Seahawks in one of the coldest games ever played, Bridgewater was 17-of-24 for 146 yards as the Vikings fell 10–9.

On January 25, 2016, he was named to his first Pro Bowl.

2016 season

During a team practice on August 30, 2016, Bridgewater suffered a non-contact injury to his left leg. A subsequent MRI confirmed that he tore his ACL and suffered other structural damage, including a dislocation of the knee joint. As a result, Bridgewater missed the rest of the 2016 season. After the loss of Bridgewater for at least the 2016 season, the Vikings traded a first-round pick in the 2017 NFL Draft and a conditional fourth-round pick in the 2018 NFL Draft to the Philadelphia Eagles for quarterback Sam Bradford. In 2016, the Vikings went 8–8, finishing third in the NFC North and missing the playoffs, despite starting the season with a 5–0 record.

2017 season
Originally, the media reported that Bridgewater's injury would keep him out for 17–19 months, meaning he would miss the entire 2017 season. In January 2017, doctors confirmed that the healing would indeed take 19 months.

On May 1, 2017, the Vikings declined the fifth-year option on Bridgewater's contract, making him a free agent after the 2017 season.

Bridgewater began throwing and doing individual work in May at Vikings mini-camps. Head coach Mike Zimmer said on June 6, that Bridgewater "has a long way to go" until he is fully healed, but was impressed by his rehabilitation progress to that point. However, on September 2, the Vikings announced that he would begin the season on the PUP list, meaning that he would miss the first six games to begin the year.

On October 16, he was cleared to practice, but could not return to action for three more weeks. Bridgewater was activated off PUP to the active roster on November 8 to be Case Keenum's backup. Bridgewater entered the Week 15 game against the Cincinnati Bengals in relief of Keenum in the fourth quarter. The crowd gave Bridgewater a standing ovation as he walked onto the field. He finished with an interception out of two pass attempts as the Vikings won 34–7.

New York Jets

On March 18, 2018, Bridgewater signed a one-year contract with the New York Jets. The contract only guaranteed a $500,000 signing bonus, though he could make up to a maximum of $15 million from a non-guaranteed salary and incentives.

New Orleans Saints

2018 season
On August 29, 2018, the Jets traded Bridgewater and a 2019 sixth-round draft pick to the New Orleans Saints for a 2019 third-round draft pick.

Bridgewater made his Saints debut on October 8 against the Washington Redskins, taking a knee twice to close out the game. He did this in two more games later in the season.

On December 28, with the Saints already having locked up the #1 seed, it was announced that Bridgewater would start in the season finale against the Carolina Panthers. Making his first start since 2015, Bridgewater finished the game completing 14 of 22 passes for 118 yards, a touchdown, and an interception as the Saints lost 33-14. He also rushed for 12 yards.

2019 season
On March 15, 2019, Bridgewater signed a one-year, $7.25 million fully guaranteed contract with the Saints. During Week 2, he replaced Drew Brees, who left with a right thumb injury, completing 17 of 30 passes for 165 yards in a 27–9 loss to the Los Angeles Rams. Due to Brees's injury, Bridgewater was named the starting quarterback for Week 3. In that game, Bridgewater completed 19 of 27 passes for 177 yards and two touchdowns as the Saints defeated the Seattle Seahawks on the road by a score of 33–27. This was the first game where Bridgewater threw for more than one touchdown in a game since week 15 of the 2015 season. In Week 5 against the Tampa Bay Buccaneers, Bridgewater threw for 314 yards, four touchdowns, and one interception in the 31–24 win. In Week 6, against the Jacksonville Jaguars, he had 240 passing yards and one passing touchdown in the 13–6 victory. In Week 7, against the Chicago Bears, he had 281 passing yards and two passing touchdowns. Brees returned from his injury in Week 8 against the Arizona Cardinals.

Carolina Panthers

On March 26, 2020, Bridgewater signed a three-year, $63 million contract with the Carolina Panthers. Bridgewater made his debut with the Panthers in Week 1 against the Las Vegas Raiders. During the game, Bridgewater threw for 269 yards, including a 75-yard touchdown to former Jets' teammate Robby Anderson, in the 34–30 loss. During Week 2 against the Tampa Bay Buccaneers, Bridgewater finished with 367 passing yards and two interceptions as the Panthers lost, 31–17. In Week 3 against the Los Angeles Chargers, Bridgewater threw for 235 yards and one touchdown during the 21–16 win. This was Bridgewater's first win as a Panther.
In Week 5 against the Atlanta Falcons, Bridgewater threw for 313 yards and two touchdowns during the 23–16 win. In Week 9 against the Kansas City Chiefs, Bridgewater threw for 310 yards and two touchdowns and rushed for 19 yards and another touchdown during the 33–31 loss. Bridgewater finished the season with career-high totals in several statistics, including completions (340), passing yards (3,733), touchdowns (15) and rushing yards (279).

Denver Broncos
On April 28, 2021, weeks after the Panthers acquired Sam Darnold in a trade with the Jets, Bridgewater was traded to the Denver Broncos in exchange for a 2021 sixth-round pick. The team brought in Bridgewater to compete with incumbent quarterback Drew Lock, and the players split starts throughout the 2021 preseason. On August 25, 2021, the Broncos announced that Bridgewater had won the starting job.

On September 12, Bridgewater made his Broncos debut on the road against the New York Giants, completing 28-of-36 passes for 264 yards and two touchdowns in a 27–13 season-opening victory. He then led the team to 2–0 with a victory over the Jacksonville Jaguars in Week 2 with a 328-yard, two-touchdown day. Bridgewater suffered a concussion in the Broncos Week 15 loss to the Cincinnati Bengals ruling him out for the rest of the season. Bridgewater was placed on injured reserve on January 5, 2022. He finished the 2021 season with 3,052 passing yards, 18 passing touchdowns, and seven interceptions to go along with two rushing touchdowns.

Miami Dolphins
On March 17, 2022, Bridgewater signed a one-year contract with the Miami Dolphins worth up to $10 million.

Bridgewater made his first appearance for the Dolphins in Week 3 against the Buffalo Bills after starter Tua Tagovailoa briefly left the game in the second quarter. He attempted two passes and was sacked once before Tagovailoa returned in the second half. In Week 4 against the Cincinnati Bengals, Bridgewater came in the second quarter after Tagovailoa left the game with a head and neck injury. Bridgewater threw for 193 yards, a touchdown, and an interception in the 27–15 loss. During Week 5 against the New York Jets, Bridgewater committed an intentional grounding penalty that occurred in the endzone for a safety. During the play, he was hit by Ahmad Gardner and left the game due to a concussion. In Week 6, against the Minnesota Vikings, Bridgewater came into the game in relief of Skylar Thompson and passed for 329 yards, two touchdowns, and two interceptions in the 24–16 loss.

Following Tua Tagovailoa entering concussion protocols after their Week 16 loss against the Green Bay Packers, head coach Mike McDaniel announced that Bridgewater would start against the New England Patriots in Week 17. In the game, Bridgewater completed 12-of-19 passes for 161 yards, a touchdown, and an interception that was returned for a touchdown before exiting the game in the third quarter after suffering a broken finger in his throwing hand. The Dolphins went on to lose 23–21. As a result of the injury, Mike McDaniel confirmed that third-string rookie quarterback Skylar Thompson will draw his second start of the season in Week 18 against the New York Jets.

NFL career statistics

Regular season

Postseason

NFL records
 First rookie quarterback to ever complete over 70% of his passes in four straight games.

Vikings franchise records
 Most wins in a season by a rookie starting quarterback: 6
 Highest single season completion percentage by a rookie: 64.4
 Highest single season passer rating by a rookie: 85.2
 Most passing attempts in a season by a rookie: 402
 Most games with 30 passing attempts by a rookie: 6
 Most games with 40 passing attempts by a rookie: 3
 Most completions in a season by a rookie: 259
 Most passing yards by a rookie quarterback: 2,919
 Longest pass by a rookie quarterback: 87
 Most completions in a game by a rookie: 31 (December 14, 2014)
 Highest completion percentage in a single game by a rookie quarterback with at least 40 attempts: 75.6% (December 14, 2014)

Personal life
Bridgewater grew up in Miami as the youngest of four children to a single mother. He is a Christian. He graduated from the University of Louisville with a degree in Sports Administration after the 2013 college football season. His mother, Rose, is a breast cancer survivor. In 2014, soon after her son was drafted by the Vikings, Cadillac presented a pink Escalade to Rose when they learned that Bridgewater had wanted to get her one since he was in the third grade.

References

External links

 Miami Dolphins bio
 Louisville Cardinals bio

1992 births
Living people
African-American players of American football
American football quarterbacks
Carolina Panthers players
Denver Broncos players
Ed Block Courage Award recipients
Louisville Cardinals football players
Miami Dolphins players
Miami Northwestern Senior High School alumni
Minnesota Vikings players
New Orleans Saints players
New York Jets players
Players of American football from Miami
Unconferenced Pro Bowl players